The 2016 Rugby World Women's Sevens Olympic Repechage Tournament was a qualification tournament for the women's rugby sevens 2016 Summer Olympics which was held on 25–26 June 2016. The tournament used a round-robin format, with the top team qualifying directly to the Olympics.

The tournament took place at the UCD Bowl in Dublin, Ireland.

Teams 

1. Kenya, as the runners-up in the African qualifying tournament, would have qualified to this tournament, but instead qualified directly for the Olympics after South Africa withdrew. Madagascar, the fifth-place finisher in qualifying, was named as a replacement.

Pool stage

Pool A

Matches

Pool B

Matches

Pool C

Matches

Pool D

Matches

Knockout stage

Shield

Bowl

Plate

Cup

See also 
 Rugby sevens at the 2020 Summer Olympics – Women's qualification

References 

Qual
2016 in women's rugby union
2016 rugby sevens competitions
2015–16 in Irish rugby union
2016 in Irish women's sport
International women's rugby union competitions hosted by Ireland
Rugby
Rugby
Rugby sevens in Ireland